Gemin or Gomeyn may refer to:
 Gomeyn, East Azerbaijan
 Gemin, Kerman